Modern Newa English School is a Nepal Bhasa-medium school located in Kathmandu, Nepal. It is a co-educational institution registered with the District Education Office of Kathmandu.

Location
The school is located at Durbar Marg, Kathmandu.

References

Newar-language schools
Schools in Kathmandu